Yuddham (English: Conflict) is a 2014 Telugu drama film directed by Bharathi Ganesh. The film stars Tarun and Yami Gautam in lead roles. The film also features late Srihari and was released as a tribute to him as he played a pivotal role in it. The film was released in 550 screens, the highest in Tarun's career. In 2017, the film was dubbed into Hindi under the same title by Wide Angle Media Pvt Ltd. The film was shot in Bangkok.

Cast
 Tarun as Rishi
 Yami Gautam as Madhumita
 Srihari as Shankar Anna
 Nagineedu
 Chandra Mohan as Rishi's father
 Krishna Bhagawan
 Duvvasi Mohan
 Apoorva as Sweety
 Venu Madhav as Seenu
 Bhupal as Rishi's brother

Soundtrack
Music was composed by Chakri. Album consists of 5 songs.

 01 – "Athadoka Sainyam" – Noel Sean, Sravana Bhargavi
 02 – "Anthenduku Nuvvu" – Simha, Sudheeksha Katiyala
 03 – "Emaindi Darlingu" – Revanth, Sahithi
 04 – "Chichu Pedthondi" – Chakri, Adarshini
 05 – "Lover Boy" – Vasu, Surabhi Sravani

References

2014 films
2010s Telugu-language films
Films scored by Chakri